Lübecker Straße is a metro station located in Hohenfelde, Hamburg, Germany. It was built and first opened on 1 March 1912, originally located in a terrain cutting. Between 1958 and 1960 the station was rebuilt into an underground, reopened on 2 July 1961.

Services 
Lübecker Straße is served by the Hamburg U-Bahn lines U1 and U3.

See also 

 List of Hamburg U-Bahn stations

References

German Wikipedia U-Bahnhof Lübecker Straße

External links 

 Lübecker Straße auf hamburger-untergrundbahn.de
 Line and route network plans at hvv.de 

Hamburg U-Bahn stations in Hamburg
U1 (Hamburg U-Bahn) stations
U3 (Hamburg U-Bahn) stations
Buildings and structures in Hamburg-Nord
Railway stations in Germany opened in 1912